Albert Bertrand W. Miller (1880–1953) was an English footballer who played for Stoke.

Career
Miller was born in Newcastle-under-Lyme and began his career with a number of local amateur sides. His performances for Stafford Rangers earned him a move to Norwich City but after failing to make an appearance he returned to his home town and joined Stoke and played 11 matches for Stoke in the 1908–09 season. He later was a key figure at the Staffordshire Football Association.

Career statistics

References

1880 births
1953 deaths
Sportspeople from Newcastle-under-Lyme
English footballers
Association football goalkeepers
Stafford Rangers F.C. players
Stoke City F.C. players
Norwich City F.C. players